The population of Botswana is divided into the main ethnic groups of Tswana people (73%), Kalanga people (18%), and Basarwa (or Bushmen) (2%). The remaining 7% consist of other peoples, including some speaking the Kgalagadi language, and 1% of non-African people.

About 73% of the total population speak Setswana as second and first language. The ethnic Tswana is split up among eight tribes: Bangwato, Bakwena, Bangwaketse, Bakgatla, Barolong,Batlokwa,Balete and Batswana. The remaining users of Setswana as a second language constitute the non-Tswana people,that is BaKalanga,Ovaherero,Veekuhane,Bakgalagari,etc.

People of Botswana 
All citizens of Botswana-regardless of colour, ancestry or tribal affiliation are known as Batswana (plural) or Motswana (singular). In the lingua franca of Tswana, tribal groups are usually denoted with the prefix 'ba', which means 'the people of...'.Therefore, the Herero are known as Baherero, and the Kgalagadi as Bakgalagadi, and so on. Botswana's eight major tribes are represented in the House of Chiefs, an advisory legislative body.

Tswana people 
The Tswana are the largest ethnic group in Botswana.

Bakalanga 

Botswana's second largest ethnic group are the Bakalanga, who mainly live in northeastern,north central as well as central parts of Botswana and Western Zimbabwe and speak Kalanga. In Botswana they are based mainly, although not exclusively, around Francistown. Modern Bakalanga are descended from the Kingdom of Butua.

Herero 

The Herero probably originated from the eastern or central Africa and migrated across the Okavango River into northeastern Namibia in the early 16th century. In 1884 the Germans took possession of German south west Africa (Namibia) and systematically appropriated Herero grazing lands. The ensuing conflict between the Germans and the Herero was to last for years, only ending in a calculated act of genocide which saw the remaining of the tribe flee across the border into Botswana. The refugees settled among the Batawana and were initially subjugated, but eventually regained their herds and independence. These days the Herero are among the wealthiest herders in Botswana.

Basubiya 
The Basubiya, Wayeyi and Mbukushu are all riverine peoples scattered around the Chobe and Linyanti rivers and across the Okavango pan-handle. Their histories and migrations are a text book example of the ebb and flow of power and influence. For a long time, the Basubiya were the dominant force, pushing the Wayeyi from the Chobe river and into the Okavango after a little spat over a lion skin, so tradition says. The Basubiya were agriculturists and as such proved easy prey for the growing Lozi Empire (from modern Zambia), which in turned collapsed in 1865. They still live in the Chobe district.

Wayeyi (Bayei) 
Originally from the same areas in Namibia and Angola as the Mbukushu, the Wyeyi moved south from the Chobe river into the Okavango Delta in the mid-18 century to avoid the growing conflict with the Basubiya.

See also
 Languages of Botswana
 List of African ethnic groups

References